Gerald ("Gary") Denis Flather, QC, OBE, (4 October 1937 – 9 October 2017) was an English barrister, judge and disability rights campaigner.

Early life and education
Flather was son of Denis Gerald Flather, group managing director of the family steel company based in Sheffield, and Joan Ada (née Walker). He was educated at Oundle School and Pembroke College, Oxford.

Career
Flather sat for ten years as a deputy High Court judge, and for 27 years as a recorder. He founded the Bar Council Disability Committee, amongst other things campaigning for improved access in courts and for disabled students' rights.

Personal life
Flather married Shreela Rai, a politician, daughter of Rai Bahadur Aftab Rai, of New Delhi, India, a barrister and diplomat; Flather fought multiple sclerosis for forty years, necessitating the use of a wheelchair.

References

1937 births
2017 deaths
Deaths from multiple sclerosis
People from Sheffield
English barristers
20th-century English judges
British disability rights activists
Neurological disease deaths in the United Kingdom
People educated at Oundle School
Alumni of Pembroke College, Oxford
Officers of the Order of the British Empire
English King's Counsel
Spouses of life peers
21st-century English judges